Robert Moncrieff may refer to:

 Robert Hope Moncrieff (1846–1927), Scottish author of children's fiction and of Black's Guides
 Robert Scott Moncrieff (1793–1869), Scottish advocate, illustrator and caricaturist